Brady Reardon (born January 3, 1986) is a Canadian sprint kayaker. At the 2008 Summer Olympics in Beijing, he finished ninth the K-4 1000 m event. He won several World Cup and international medals.

References

External links 
Sports-Reference.com profile

1986 births
Canadian male canoeists
Canoeists at the 2008 Summer Olympics
Living people
Olympic canoeists of Canada
Canoeists at the 2015 Pan American Games
Pan American Games competitors for Canada